Christina Hattler is an American fashion designer. Born and raised in Miami, she is based in Mexico City. She has two distinct and successful lines under the labels, Christina Hattler hand-made, a line of unique hand-sewn dresses and Christina Hattler, a line of limited edition produced pieces. She shows both lines in New York during New York Fashion Week, though unlike many established designers, she chooses to show off 7th Avenue in favor of more intimate settings. Her Fall 2006 collection titled, Duality, was shown at albertine, in the West Village in New York City.

She counts young celebrities and socialites such as Bryce Dallas Howard, Michelle Williams, Nicole Richie, Victoria Traina and Amber Valletta amongst her best clients. She has been featured in numerous national and international publications such as Elle, British Vogue, Teen Vogue, London Telegraph, WWD, Style.com, Jane, Lucky, People, & Entertainment Weekly.

External links
 Official Website

American fashion designers
American women fashion designers
Living people
Year of birth missing (living people)
21st-century American women